Stadio Steno Borghese is a baseball stadium located in Nettuno, Italy. It was built in 1991.

See also
2009 Baseball World Cup

External links
 Sito della squadra ospitante
 Italian Baseball and Softball Federation

1991 establishments in Italy
20th century in Lazio
Steno Borghese
Buildings and structures in the Metropolitan City of Rome Capital
Sport in the Metropolitan City of Rome Capital
Stenno Borghese
Steno Borghese